Bois Roussel (1935–1955) was a French-bred Thoroughbred champion racehorse and a leading broodmare sire. He won the 1938 Epsom Derby on his second racecourse appearance.

Background
He was named for Haras du Bois-Roussel, the breeding farm in Alençon where he was foaled. His breeder was Leon Volterra who acquired his sire, Vatout, and his dam as part of his purchase of Haras du Bois Roussel from American, Jefferson Davis Cohn. According to Thoroughbred Heritage, his dam, Plucky Liege, was one of the most important broodmares of the 20th century. At the time of foaling Bois Roussel Plucky Liege was 23 years old.

Racing career
Bois Roussel did not start as a two-year-old. Raced at age three by Leon Volterra, he made his racing debut in early 1938 at Longchamp Racecourse in Paris, winning the Prix Juigné, an event for unraced colts and geldings. Shortly thereafter, Volterra sold Bois Roussel for £8,000 to the Hon. Peter Beatty, son of Admiral David Beatty and grandson of Chicago department store magnate, Marshall Field.

His new owner sent Bois Roussel to England to run in June's Epsom Derby. Making just the second start of his career, bettors sent the colt off at 20/1 odds. Ridden by jockey Charlie Elliott Bois Roussel scored an upset victory in England's most prestigious race. He was slowly away and among the back markers entering the straight. In the final quarter mile he produced what the Glasgow Herald described as "an astonishing burst of speed" to come from well off the pace and take the lead inside the final furlong. He won going away by four lengths from Scottish Union and the favourite Pasch. In winning, he earned more in prize money than Beatty had paid for him.

In his only other race start, Bois Roussel ran third to the undefeated Nearco in the Grand Prix de Paris.

Stud record
Bois Roussel was rested as a four-year-old and went to stud in stud duty in England, in 1940 at a fee of 300 guineas. His stud career was satisfactory without being spectacular. Among his progeny were:
 Castagnola (dam of Zucchero who won ten races value £14,837)
 Delville Wood (1942)  – four wins worth £3,020, five-time leading sire in Australia
 Edie Kelly dam of St. Paddy (1957) – won Epsom Derby, St. Leger Stakes
 Fraise du Bois II (1948) – won Irish Derby
 French Beige – won Doncaster Cup 
 Hikaru Meiji (JPN) Tokyo Yushun (Derby) 
 Hindostan (1946) – won Irish Derby, seven-time Leading sire in Japan
 Migoli (1944) – won £22,950 in England plus 5,209,500 francs in France including the Prix de l'Arc de Triomphe,  sired Belmont Stakes winner Gallant Man
 Fraise du Bois (three wins value £11,226 and second in the St. Leger) 
 Ridge Wood (1946) – won seven races, £21,658 including the St. Leger Stakes
 Star of Iran dam of Petite Etoile (1956) - wins included The Oaks, 1,000 Guineas Stakes, and the Coronation Cup twice
 Swallow Tail (six wins value £12,440, third in the Derby and exported to Brazil)
 Tehran (1941) –  won £7,258 including St. Leger Stakes, leading sire in Great Britain and Ireland (1952), sired Tulyar
 Woodburn (1945) – winner of the Yorkshire Cup and Cesarewitch Handicap.
 Last but not least he is the great grandfather of Red Rum, the three-time winner of the Aintree Grand National.
He was not a leading sire but was second on the list of sires of winners in both 1947 and 1949. Bois Roussel's daughters were also outstanding producers who made him the Leading broodmare sire in Great Britain & Ireland in 1959 and 1960.

Bois Roussel died in October 1955, in France at age 20 because of severe laminitis.

Pedigree

See also
List of leading Thoroughbred racehorses

References

1935 racehorse births
1955 racehorse deaths
British Champion Thoroughbred broodmare sires
Racehorses bred in France
Racehorses trained in France
Thoroughbred family 16-a
Chefs-de-Race
Epsom Derby winners